The Yirrkala bark petitions, sent by the Yolngu people, an Aboriginal Australian people of Arnhem Land in the Northern Territory, to the Australian Parliament in 1963, were the first traditional documents prepared by Indigenous Australians that were recognised by the Australian Parliament, and the first documentary recognition of Indigenous people in Australian law. The petitions asserted that the Yolngu people owned land over which the federal government had granted mining rights to a private company, Nabalco.

In 1971 the court decided that the ordinances and mining leases were valid, and that the Yolngu people were not able to establish their native title at common law, in a decision known as the Milirrpum decision, or the Gove land rights case.

History
Wali Wunungmurra, one of the 12 signatories to the petitions, describes the background to the petitions as follows:
"In the late 1950s Yolngu became aware of people prospecting for minerals in the area of the Gove Peninsula, and shortly after, discovered that mining leases had been taken out over a considerable area of our traditional land. Our response, in 1963, was to send a petition framed by painted bark to the Commonwealth Government demanding that our rights be recognised."

Five brothers of the Rirratjingu clan, Mawalan Marika, Mathaman Marika, Milirrpum Marika, Dhunggala Marika and Dadaynga "Roy" Marika led the thirteen clans, being traditional owners of the land in question. Wandjuk Marika (son of Mawalan) helped to draft the bark petitions, which were sent to the Australian House of Representatives, where they were tabled on 14 and 28 August 1963. The petitions were written in the Yolngu language, together with an English translation.

They are on permanent display at Parliament House, Canberra, along with a digging stick known as the Djang'kawu digging stick, associated with the creation story of the Yolngu people.

The bark petitions asserted that the Yolngu people owned the land and protested the Commonwealth's granting of mining rights to Nabalco of land excised from the Arnhem Aboriginal Land reserve.  The son of one of the Yirrkala plaintiffs, a Gumatj clan leader, Munggurrawuy, was Galarrwuy Yunupingu who assisted in drafting the petitions.

The petitions stated that "the land in question has been hunting and food gathering land for the Yirrkala tribes from time immemorial" and "that places sacred to the Yirrkala people, as well as vital to their livelihood are in the excised land". They expressed the petitioners' "fear that their needs and interests will be completely ignored as they have been ignored in the past". The petitions called on the House of Representatives to "appoint a Committee, accompanied by competent interpreters, to hear the views of the people of Yirrkala before permitting the excision" of the land for the mine and to ensure "that no arrangements be entered into with any company which will destroy the livelihood and independence of the Yirrkala people". Thus, the petitions are the first formal assertion of native title.

The Australian Government's response was to establish the House of Representatives Select Committee on Grievances of the Yirrkala Aborigines, Arnhem Land Reserve in 1963. In its report, the Select Committee recommended that the Yirrkala people should be compensated for loss of their traditional occupancy, by way of (1) land grant; (2) payment of at least the first  received in mining royalties; and (3) direct monetary compensation, even though Aboriginal land rights were not expressly recognised under Northern Territory laws.

However, the recommendations of the House of Representatives Select Committee regarding compensation payments were ignored in the Mining (Gove Peninsula Nabalco Agreement) Ordinance 1968 (NT), which unilaterally revoked part of the Yirrkala Aboriginal reserve in order to enable Nabalco to develop the mine.

The Aboriginal clans whose traditional lands were affected by the Gove project were so strongly opposed to the making of the  Mining (Gove Peninsula Nabalco Agreement) Ordinance 1968 that they challenged it in the Supreme Court of the Northern Territory in 1968 in Milirrpum v Nabalco Pty Ltd (the "Gove land rights case"). In 1971 Justice Richard Blackburn held that the ordinances and mining leases were valid and that the Yolngu people were not able to establish their native title at common law. Justice Blackburn stated that the "doctrine of communal native title does not form and never has formed, part of the law of any part of Australia".

The Milirrpum decision had wide-ranging impacts on relations between Aboriginal people and the mining industry generally throughout Australia. In response to the Milirrpum decision, in 1973 the Whitlam government established the Aboriginal Land Rights Commission, headed by Justice Edward Woodward, to inquire into "the appropriate means to recognise and establish the traditional rights and interests of the Aborigines in and in relation to the land, and to satisfy in other ways the reasonable aspirations of the Aborigines to rights in or in relation to land".

Significance
The 1963 Yirrkala petitions were the first traditional documents prepared by Indigenous Australians recognised by the Australian Parliament, and are the first documentary recognition of Indigenous people in Australian law.

See also
 Aboriginal land rights in Australia
 Barunga Statement 
 Uluru Statement from the Heart

 Yirrkala Church Panels

References

External links
 National Archives of Australia - Yirrkala bark petitions 1963 (Cth)
 Australian Institute of Aboriginal and Torres Strait Islander Studies - Yirrkala bark petitions 1963

Aboriginal land rights in Australia
History of Indigenous Australians
Yolngu
Australian Indigenous law